The FIBA U16 African Championship is an under-16 basketball championship in the International Basketball Federation's FIBA Africa zone. The tournament is held biennially. The top two teams in the competition qualify for the FIBA Under-17 Basketball World Cup.

Summary

Medal table

MVP Awards

Participating nations

Under-17 World Cup record

See also
 FIBA African Championship
 FIBA U18 African Championship
 FIBA Africa Under-20 Championship

References

External links
 2011 U-16 Championship - africabasket.com
 - FIBA Archives

 
Africa
Under-16